Aleksandr Gorshkov (25 November 1928 – 20 January 1993) was a Soviet athlete. He competed in the men's javelin throw at the 1956 Summer Olympics.

References

1928 births
1993 deaths
Athletes (track and field) at the 1956 Summer Olympics
Soviet male javelin throwers
Olympic athletes of the Soviet Union
Athletes from Moscow